Gudem Mahipal Reddy is an Indian political activist who is the current member of the Telangana Legislative Assembly from Patancheru constituency. He belongs to Telangana Rashtra Samithi. He won election in 2014 and 2018 General Elections.

References

Telangana MLAs 2018–2023
Telangana politicians
Telangana Rashtra Samithi politicians
1981 births
Living people